Quelli dell'intervallo (lit. "Those of Recess") is an Italian situation comedy produced by Disney Channel Italy. The show focuses on kids as they chat and get into unexpected situations while at a window in their school.

After Disney's success with the show, the idea was replicated throughout continental Europe, and eventually Asia, Australia, and the United States. In total, fourteen different shows have spun off from Quelli dell'intervallo.

The show finally ended in 2009 ending the series with Quelli dell'intervallo – In Vacanza. The show ended with the kids finishing primary school and going to high school.

The series spawned three spin-offs: Quelli dell'Intervallo Cafe, where the protagonists have gone to different high schools, and the only place where they can still be together is in a cafe,  Fiore e Tinelli, starring Tinelli (Matteo Leoni), one of the main and most popular characters of the series, and his neighbour Fiore (Francesca Calabrese), and Casa Pierpiero, that follows young Pierpiero (Federico Mezzottoni), a rich boy who falls in love with a goth girl.

Characters
Tinelli – Matteo Leoni (it)
Valentina – Giulia Boverio
Dred – Mattia Rovatti (it)
Secchia – Marc Tainon
Mafalda "Mafy" – Ambra Lo Faro (it)
Annina – Andrea Leoni
Nico- Romolo Guerreri (it)
Dj – Diana Chihade (it)
Smilzo – Alessandro Vivian
Jaky – Jacopo Sarno
Rudy – Valentina Ghelfi
Isabella "Bella" – Clara Tarozzo
Tommy – Giulio Rubinelli
Spiffy – Edoardo Baietti
Rocky – Elisabetta Miracoli
Spy – Alvaro Caleca
Mrs. Martinelli – Clelia Piscitello
The dean – Giovanni Battezzato (it)

See also
As the Bell Rings

Italian children's television series
2005 Italian television series debuts
Disney Channels Worldwide original programming
2000s Italian television series
2000s high school television series
2000s teen sitcoms
Italian-language Disney Channel original programming
Television series about teenagers